The Ngbandi are an ethnic group from the region of the upper Ubangi River; they inhabit the northern Democratic Republic of the Congo (DRC) and southern Central African Republic. They traditionally speak the Ngbandi language, which is part of the Ubangian language family. Historically the Ngbandi were subsistence farmers, and many still grow maize, manioc, and other food crops.  Until recently, some of their subsistence depended on traditional hunting and gathering.  

They were once known as warriors, and some of the most prized African knives and lances were made by their craftsmen. This culture and others of Sudan had close connections, as expressed by shared usage of a musical instrument, a kind of harp, whose form is distinctive to this area.

Mobutu Sese Seko, the president and dictator of Zaire, came from the Ngbandi ethnic group and was born in Lisala, DRC.

References

See also
Ngbandi Art
Linguistic classification of Ngbandi, Ethnologue

 
Ethnic groups in the Central African Republic
Ethnic groups in the Democratic Republic of the Congo